İdris Naim Şahin (born 1 June 1956, Ünye, Ordu, Turkey) is a Turkish politician who was elected to the Turkish Grand National Assembly in 2002, representing Istanbul.

He was appointed to the Ministry of Internal Affairs on 6 July 2011 by Prime Minister Recep Tayyip Erdogan in his new cabinet. On 24 January 2013, he was replaced by Muammer Güler at his post.

Şahin resigned from the ruling Justice and Development Party on 25 December 2013 amidst the corruption scandal involving several ministers.

References

External links
 TBMM profile 

1956 births
Istanbul University Faculty of Law alumni
Living people
Justice and Development Party (Turkey) politicians
Ministers of the Interior of Turkey
Deputies of Istanbul
Members of the 24th Parliament of Turkey
Members of the 23rd Parliament of Turkey
Members of the 22nd Parliament of Turkey